Chrysomphalus aonidum, known generally as Florida red scale, is a species of armored scale insect in the family Diaspididae. Other common names include the Egyptian black scale, circular black scale, and citrus black scale. It is found in Europe.

References

Articles created by Qbugbot
Insects described in 1758
Taxa named by Carl Linnaeus
Aspidiotina